Benjamin Edward Miller (born June 17, 1983) is an American former competitive figure skater who competed in men's singles. He is the 2002 Nebelhorn Trophy silver medalist, 2002 Golden Spin of Zagreb bronze medalist, and 1999 JGP Slovenia silver medalist. He competed at the 2001 World Junior Championships, placing 15th, and appeared once on the senior Grand Prix series, placing tenth at the 2002 NHK Trophy.

In January 2005, Miller said he was looking for an ice dancing partner following an injury that ended his singles career.

Miller attended St. Paul Central High School and the University of Minnesota. He married Sean Peter Reisman on March 16, 2012.

Programs

Results
GP: Grand Prix; JGP: Junior Grand Prix

References

External links
 

American male single skaters
Living people
1983 births
Sportspeople from Saint Paul, Minnesota
LGBT figure skaters
American LGBT sportspeople
LGBT people from Minnesota
Gay sportsmen
21st-century LGBT people